The Nostocales are an order of cyanobacteria containing most of its species. It includes filamentous forms, both simple or branched, and both those occurring as single strands or multiple strands within a sheath. Some members show a decrease in width from the base, and some have heterocysts.

References

 
Bacteria orders